Monster Crown is a 2021 role-playing video game developed by Studio Aurum and published by Soedesco. Heavily inspired by early games in the Pokémon series, it features similar mechanics, but with a darker fictional universe and storyline. The game received mixed reviews from critics, who praised its gameplay and graphical style, but noted significant bugs and performance issues, and also criticized it for game balance issues as well as its story.

Gameplay
Monster Crown features 200 base monsters for the player to form pacts with. Over 1200 monsters are usable in the game through the monster breeding mechanic.

Development
Development of the game was performed by Canadian game developer Studio Aurum, with game development beginning in 2016. The game was crowdfunded on Kickstarter in 2018. In 2019 it was announced that  Soedesco would be the publisher of the game.

Monster Crown entered an early access availability period on PC on July 31, 2020, being distributed on Steam during that time. Over 40 updates were made to the game during the early access period.

The 1.0 version of Monster Crown was released on October 12, 2021 for Microsoft Windows, Linux, MacOS, and Nintendo Switch. A physical Nintendo Switch edition of the game was released on November 2, 2021. The PlayStation 4 and Xbox One releases were delayed in late 2021, eventually releasing on February 22, 2022.

Reception

On Metacritic the game received an aggregate score of 59/100 for the Nintendo Switch version, and 62/100 for the Xbox One version, indicating "mixed or average reviews".

Reviewers generally praised the extensive monster breeding mechanics used by the game.

Mitch Vogel of Nintendo Life commented on the aesthetics and audio of the game, noting that they drew inspiration from the Game Boy Color well, while also finding the monster designs generally "uninspired", with a few exceptions.

Neal Chandran of RPGFan positively reviewed the exploration aspects of the game, while noting a more mixed reception to the story, particularly noting poor execution in pacing and dialogue.

References 

2021 video games
Indie video games
Kickstarter-funded video games
Linux games
MacOS games
Multiplayer and single-player video games
Nintendo Switch games
PlayStation 4 games
Role-playing video games
Video games developed in Canada
Windows games
Xbox One games
Retro-style video games
Soedesco games